Ziya Öniş (born May 12, 1957 in Istanbul) is a Turkish political economist, and professor of international relations at Koç University in Istanbul, Turkey. He is a former Director of the Graduate School of Social Sciences and Humanities at Koç University.

He received his BSc and MSc degrees in economics from London School of Economics. He obtained his PhD from University of Manchester in the field of development economics in 1984. He works at the intersection of political science and economics. He has published extensively on the political of Turkey, Turkish foreign policy and broader issues in global political economy. His work has appeared in leading journals of political science, international relations and development studies and he has been widely cited. His "The logic of the developmental state" article continues to be his most popular publication. He has collaborated extensively with important scholars in his field including Fikret Şenses, Fuat Keyman, Şuhnaz Yılmaz, Selim Erdem Aytaç, James Riedel among others. His collaboration with Mustafa Kutlay over the past decade has been particularly productive resulting in a large number of influential articles.

Life 
Ziya Öniş is the grandson of Yusuf Ziya Onis who was the founding president of the Turkish Football Association and also served as the Chairman of the leading Turkish soccer team Galatasaray on two consecutive occasions. A major part of his education was received in the UK. He is married with two children and four grandchildren. Beyond his academic pursuits he is a football fan and a nature lover. Concern with environmental issues have become an increasingly important for him in recent years.

Career 
During his graduate studies at Manchester he worked under the supervision of Colin Kirkpatrick and Frederick Nixson. During early stages of his career in the Economics Department at Boğaziçi University, Öniş participated in several OECD and World Bank projects as a consultant, in addition to his academic publications. Ziya Öniş became a full professor at a relatively early age in 1995. He joined the International Relations Department of Koç University in September 1999 and has been a faculty member at Koç ever since. Prof. Öniş is a member of The Turkish Academy of Sciences (TÜBA). Due to his significant contributions to Turkish political economy, Turkish foreign policy and Turkish politics from a comparative perspective, he received TUBITAK Science Award in Social Sciences in July 2012, an award which is recognized as the most prestigious scientific award in Turkey.

At Koç University, he served as the Acting Dean of the College of Administrative Sciences and Economics (2001-2002), Director of the Graduate School of Social Sciences and Humanities (2006-2009) and Director of the Center for Globalization, Peace and Democratic Governance, GLODEM (2010-2013).

Selected bibliography 
Full list of publications.

Books

Selected Journal articles 
A select group of his best-known articles include  
 Öniş, Ziya. "The logic of the developmental state." Comparative Politics , Oct., 1991, Vol. 24, No. 1 (Oct., 1991), pp. 109-126
 Öniş, Ziya, and Fikret Şenses. "Rethinking the emerging post‐Washington consensus." Development and change 36.2 (2005): 263-290.
 Öniş, Ziya, and Şuhnaz Yilmaz. "Between Europeanization and Euro‐asianism: Foreign policy activism in Turkey during the AKP era." Turkish Studies 10.1 (2009): 7-24.
 Onis, Ziya. "The political economy of Islamic resurgence in Turkey: The rise of the Welfare Party in perspective." Third World Quarterly 18.4 (1997): 743-766.
 Öniş, Ziya. "Turgut Özal and his economic legacy: Turkish neo-liberalism in critical perspective." Middle Eastern Studies 40.4 (2004): 113-134.
 Öniş, Ziya. "Multiple Faces of the “New” Turkish Foreign Policy: Underlying Dynamics and." Insight Turkey 13.1 (2011): 47-65.
 Öniş, Ziya. "Domestic politics, international norms and challenges to the state: Turkey-EU relations in the post-Helsinki Era." Turkish studies 4.1 (2003): 9-34.
 Öniş, Ziya. "The triumph of conservative globalism: The political economy of the AKP era." Turkish Studies 13.2 (2012): 135-152.
 Onis, Ziya, and M. Hakan Yavuz. "The Emergence of a New Turkey: Democracy and the AK Parti." (2006): 207.
 ,
 
 

His most recent works include:

 Kutlay, Mustafa, and Ziya Öniş. "Liberal democracy on the edge? Anxieties in a shifting global (dis) order." Alternatives 48.1 (2023): 20-37.
 Öniş, Ziya. "Turkey’s New Presidential Regime: Fragility, Resilience, Reversibility." REFLEKTİF: Journal of Social Sciences 4.1 (2023): 159-179.
 Öniş, Ziya. "Historic missed opportunities and prospects for renewal: Turkey-EU relations in a post-Western order." Turkish Studies (2023): 1-23.
 Kutlay, Mustafa, and Ziya Öniş. "Understanding oscillations in Turkish foreign policy: pathways to unusual middle power activism." Third World Quarterly 42.12 (2021): 3051-3069.
 Öniş, Ziya. “The West Versus The Rest: The Russian Invasion Of Ukraine And The Crisis Of The ‘Post-Western’ Order.” Transatlantic Policy Quartely, vol. 21, no. 4, 2023, pp. 33–52.

References

External links
 Ziya Öniş Google Scholar Page
 The Center for Research on Globalization and Democratic Governance (GLODEM)
 Prof. Öniş Homepage
 Koç University

1957 births
Development economists
Living people
Turkish economists
Academic staff of Boğaziçi University
Academic staff of Koç University